He Ping (14 October 1957 – 10 January 2023) was a Chinese film director, screenwriter and producer born in Shanxi whose main filmography consists of a hybrid genre of Western-wuxia movies. He made three movies along this genre - Swordsmen in Double Flag Town (1991), Sun Valley (1995) and Warriors of Heaven and Earth (2004).

Personal life and background
He Ping's mother was the female lead in Communist China's first feature film Bridge (1949). She was an ethnic Manchu whose ancestors were members of the Blue Banners, while He Ping's father was Han Chinese.

He Ping died in Beijing, China on 10 January 2023, at the age of 65.

Directorial career 
He Ping began his directorial career in the 1980s, directing stage productions and documentary films. By the late 1980s, He transferred to the Xi'an Film Studio, where he began directing fiction films, including We Are the World and Kawashima Yoshiko a film based on the story of the Manchurian-Japanese princess, Kawashima Yoshiko. In the 1990s, He directed two major Chinese Westerns, Swordsmen in Double Flag Town and Sun Valley, and the historical drama Red Firecracker, Green Firecracker. Swordsmen in Double Flag Town went on to win the Grand Prize at the 3rd Yubari International Fantastic Film Festival in February 1992. Sun Valley was entered into the 46th Berlin International Film Festival where it won an Honourable Mention.

In the 2000s, He struck success with his 2004 adventure film Warriors of Heaven and Earth, starring Jiang Wen. He Ping's followed this with another historical action film, Wheat, starring Fan Bingbing, which was released in 2009.

His film The Promised Land received an honorable mention from the Platform jury at the 2015 Toronto International Film Festival.

Filmography

References

External links

He Ping at the Chinese Movie Database

1957 births
2023 deaths
Film directors from Shanxi
Manchu people
People from Taiyuan